Julien Desrosiers (born October 14, 1980) is a Canadian-French former ice hockey player. He played in French Ligue Magnus for the Diables Noirs de Tours, the Diables Rouges de Briançon, the Dragons de Rouen and the Boxers de Bordeaux. He represented France in ten Ice Hockey World Championships. He is currently head coach for the Drummondville Voltigeurs of the Quebec Major Junior Hockey League (QMJHL).

Playing career
He started his career in 1997 playing for Rimouski Océanic in the QMJHL. He notably played with Vincent Lecavalier and Brad Richards, who played in the National Hockey League later. In 2001, he left North America to play in France for the Étoile Noire de Strasbourg in Division 1, the second level of national ice hockey, during one season.

References

External links

1980 births
Living people
Boxers de Bordeaux players
Diables Noirs de Tours players
Diables Rouges de Briançon players
Drummondville Voltigeurs players
Étoile Noire de Strasbourg players
French ice hockey forwards
Ice hockey people from Quebec
Rimouski Océanic players
Rouen HE 76 players